Mangatāwhiri is a locality about 10 km north-east of Pōkeno and 7 km west of Mangatangi in the Waikato District in the North Island of New Zealand.

The Mangatawhiri area unit, which is much larger than the locality and includes Mangatangi, had a population of 1,533 at the 2013 New Zealand census, an increase of 153 people since the 2006 census. There were 825 males and 708 females. 83.1% were European/Pākehā, 14.8% were Māori, 4.1% were Pacific peoples and 4.5% were Asian. The locality is in meshblocks 0841700 and 0843401, which had a population of 117 people in 48 households in the census.

The New Zealand Ministry for Culture and Heritage gives a translation of "tāwhiri tree stream" for Mangatāwhiri.

The Mangatāwhiri castle is a prominent building on Mangatawhiri Road which once housed the Castle Cafe but is now empty.

Mangatāwhiri River flows south from the Hunua Ranges through Mangatāwhiri, and joins the Waikato River near Mercer.

History 

In the late 19th century, Mangatāwhiri was a major location for the kauri gum digging trade.

Education 
In 1962 a new school was built on the same site, and it has since been expanded to seven classrooms.

References 

Waikato District
Populated places in Waikato
Kauri gum